The Great River   is a river of Grenada.

See also 
 List of rivers of Grenada

References 
  GEOnet Names Server
 Grenada map

Rivers of Grenada